Fredrik Löwegren (born 18 September 1973) is a Swedish orienteering competitor. He received a bronze medal in the relay event at the 2000 European Orienteering Championships in Truskavets, and a silver medal in 2002. He placed 46th in the overall Orienteering World Cup in 1996, 13th in 1998, 23rd in 2000, and 17th in 2002.

He won the 5-days event O-Ringen in 1999.

Löwegren became Junior World Champion in relay in 1991.

References

External links
 
 Fredrik Löwegren at World of O Runners

1973 births
Living people
Swedish orienteers
Male orienteers
Foot orienteers
Junior World Orienteering Championships medalists